The Love's RV Stop 250 is a NASCAR Craftsman Truck Series race that takes place at Talladega Superspeedway. The race has been in the playoffs ever since the addition of it to the Truck Series schedule and every year since then, the race has been won by a non-playoff driver. The winner has only led the last lap of the race in several recent years it has been run.

Matt DiBenedetto is the defending winner.

History

The race was first held on October 7, 2006, as the John Deere 250.

Past winners

2009–10, 2014–2015, 2017, 2019, 2021 and 2022: The race was extended due to a NASCAR Overtime finish.

Multiple winners (drivers)

Multiple winners (teams)

Manufacturer wins

References

External links
 

NASCAR Truck Series races
 
2006 establishments in Alabama
Annual sporting events in the United States
Recurring sporting events established in 2006
Saturday events
October sporting events